Wau Airport is a civilian airport that serves the city of Wau and surrounding communities. Feeder Airlines has three return flights a week between Khartoum-Wau-Juba. Southern Star Airlines used to provide service on Wednesdays and Sundays to Juba; however, this service has been suspended in 2011 when the airline ceased flying.

Location
Wau Airport  is located in Wau County, Wau State, in the city of Wau. The airport is located to the northeast of the central business district of the city.

The geographic coordinates of Wau Airport are: 7° 72' 58.12"N, 27° 97' 31.00"E (Latitude: 7.7250; Longitude: 27.9800).

Airlines and destinations

Service to Juba, South Sudan was provided by Southern Star Airlines until the airline's failure in late 2011.

Accidents and incidents
 2017 South Supreme Airlines Antonov An-26 crash: occurred on 20 March 2017

See also
 Western Bahr el Ghazal
 Bahr el Ghazal

References

External links
  Location of Wau Airport At Google Maps

Airports in South Sudan
Western Bahr el Ghazal
Bahr el Ghazal